Dunlap is a city in Morris County, Kansas, United States.  As of the 2020 census, the population of the city was 27.

History
On March 19, 1874, a post office was established in Hillsborough, Kansas. It was later reestablished on April 20 of the same year as Dunlap, Kansas. This was named after an Indian agent representing the Kanza tribe named Joseph Gage Dunlap who had founded the town in 1869 once the Kanza tribe had migrated to Oklahoma. The town grew slowly after its founding, making it five years to be eligible for a post office.

The town really started to take off when Benjamin "Pap" Singleton came to town in the spring of 1878. He was born a slave in 1809 in Nashville, Tennessee. At 37, in 1846, he escaped to freedom and made his way to Detroit and started an underground boarding house for other escaped slaves. Following the emancipation, he returned to Nashville.

Following the Civil War, newly freed slaves in the South enjoyed their time as free citizens. However, when American troops were removed their rights were no longer secure. This brought up the Ku Klux Klan and then continued to wreak havoc on African Americans. The Klan then continued to terrorize and killed African Americans if they did not bend to their will, and a new system of sharecropping and Jim Crow laws virtually re-enslaved African Americans. Singleton, having returned to the South, realized something needed to be done. Having knowledge that Kansas was famous for John Brown's efforts and its struggle against slavery he chose it as the place he would lead his people, treating it as a type of “promised land”. Singleton continued to support this effort by traveling across the South organizing groups of people to colonize in Kansas. His mission to free slaves never stopped and during the 1870s, he led a group of African Americans to Kansas. Here he formed Singleton's Colony which consisted of 200 black families and was situated on 7,500 acres of land. Singleton, however, encouraged only independent blacks to move to Kansas and was against the highly educated “political” ones as he wanted men that worked. Singleton moved to Dunlap in 1878. He then decided this is where we would lead more freed slaves escaping the South. He distributed posters and flyers boasting; “Sunny Kansas”, “one of the finest countries for a poor man in the world”, “plenty of stone and water, and wood on the streams”, and “large tracts of land, peaceful homes, and firesides, undisturbed by anyone”. Between 1877 and 1879, hundreds followed him to Kansas, some settling in Wyandotte, others in “Singleton’s Colony”, near Topeka, and finally in Dunlap. Dunlap was Singleton's biggest success giving himself the name “Father of the Exodus”. After this initial movement, the second wave of almost 20,000 African Americans migrated to Kansas. These people are known as Exodusters. They arrived daily in waves of hundreds of people between 1879 and 1880. Unlike the first group led by Singleton, the Exodusters came with no resources. The towns and communities they migrated too already struggled with supporting a large population, so this large influx of people did not help. These communities went to the state government for help in this and it resulted in the Kansas  Freedmen's Relief Association in 1879. The KFRA distributed resources for struggling African American families established by Dunlaps governor John st. John. This gave those with little resources the ability to improve their quality of life and be a vital part of their communities. Benjamin “Pap” Singleton died peacefully in 1900, in Kansas City, Missouri. Towards the end of his life, he was comforted by the fact that he led thousands to a better life in Kansas providing people of the future a better place to live.

After Singleton's death, the community continued to grow through the beginning of the 20th century. In 1880, the Presbyterian church's Rev. John M. Snodgrass was a missionary to the freedmen, and he founded the Freedmen's Academy. This was founded so that African Americans could have a proper education. The church is now collapsed and has been in disrepair since the 1930s. Because of the large influx of African Americans, the original settlers and townspeople of Dunlap were not originally happy that Singleton chose Dunlap as a relocation spot for freed slaves. In the late 1800s and early 20th century, the newly freed slaves faced some prejudice. However, it was nothing compared to the hate and terror they were put through in the South. While they were segregated in schools and businesses, African Americans were able to own and run their own. That is also why they had to find their own school. For certain parts of Dunlap's history, they were also confined to their own cemetery, Dunlap Colored Cemetery chartered in 1894.

Now after its founding, and after Singleton brought large numbers of Exodusters to Dunlap and its surrounding areas. At the turn of the century, Dunlap was home to hundreds of citizens and served as a major shipping port for the surrounding counties, Morris, Lyon, and Chase. Being located on the Neosho River the fields were fertile and it helped Dunlap grow even further. During its heyday, Dunlap was home to a blacksmith, the Guarantee State Bank, Baptist, Congregational and Methodist churches an ice cream lounge, a dairy factory producing cheese and butter, a hotel, and a flour mill. However, with racism still being present some store owners wouldn't let African Americans into their businesses and were forced to run their own. This segregation eventually fell away as Dunlap integrated stores and schools far before the rest of the country. With Dunlap being a virtual “promised land” for African Americans escaping racism in the South and while Dunlap had thrived in the early 20th century it fell victim to the Great Depression.

In the 1930s the Dust Bowl also occurred. The Dust Bowl was caused by poor farming techniques and resulted in dust storms across the country. This resulted in difficulties in growing crops. All these factors lead to the abandonment of small farming communities across the country, resulting in the ghost town. The last celebration of Juneteenth, a celebration of the day slaves heard they were emancipated, was in 1931. Eventually, the bank filed for bankruptcy and businesses closed. This was then followed by the school and then the church closing its doors, even the old Methodist church which was donated to the Kansas Historical Society. And just as fast as the population grew, it fell. Hundreds left to find a better life, many going to Kansas City, Council Grove, and other larger communities. Eventually, the economy came back and was stronger than it ever had been. However, the old Dunlap never returned and if it is known, it is only known as one of the many ghost towns of Kansas.

The post office finally closed its doors in 1988 marking the end of Dunlap. Dunlap is now an unincorporated territory of Kansas and is only home to roughly thirty people. Its last Black resident was buried in the colored cemetery on April 27, 1993, to be with family.

Dunlap Colored Cemetery
Dunlap's Colored Cemetery, also known as the Exoduster Cemetery was nominated to the National Register of Historic Places by Janet Kimbrell and the Morris County Historical Society. Dunlap's Colored Cemetery was built in response to segregation and the prejudice against the Exoduster community. The cemetery was first established in 1880 and is now occupied with over a hundred African American graves. Dunlap's Colored Cemetery was added to the register on September 14, 2018. The Cemetery was officially added for its association with the Exoduster's Movement and to “Pap” Singleton the Father of the Exodus.

Geography
Dunlap is located at  (38.575818, -96.366117). Dunlap is near the Neosho river which has historically caused issues with flooding.

Climate
The climate in this area is characterized by hot, humid summers and generally mild to cool winters.  According to the Köppen Climate Classification system, Dunlap has a humid subtropical climate, abbreviated "Cfa" on climate maps.

Demographics

2010 census
As of the census of 2010, there were 30 people, 11 households, and 10 families residing in the city. The racial makeup of the city was 96.7% White and 3.3% from two or more races.

There were 11 households, of which 27.3% had children under the age of 18 living with them, 63.6% were married couples living together, 9.1% had a female householder with no husband present, 18.2% had a male householder with no wife present, and 9.1% were non-families. 9.1% of all households were made up of individuals. The average household size was 2.73 and the average family size was 2.90.

The median age in the city was 45.5 years. 16.7% of residents were under the age of 18; 16.7% were between the ages of 18 and 24; 16.6% were from 25 to 44; 36.7% were from 45 to 64; and 13.3% were 65 years of age or older. The gender makeup of the city was 60.0% male and 40.0% female.

2000 census
As of the census of 2000, there were 81 people, 25 households, and 21 families residing in the city. The racial makeup of the city was 95.06% White, 1.23% from other races, and 3.70% from two or more races. Hispanic or Latino of any race were 1.23% of the population.

There were 25 households, out of which 52.0% had children under the age of 18 living with them, 72.0% were married couples living together, 12.0% had a female householder with no husband present, and 16.0% were non-families. 16.0% of all households were made up of individuals, and 8.0% had someone living alone who was 65 years of age or older. The average household size was 3.24 and the average family size was 3.62.

In the city, the population was spread out, with 38.3% under the age of 18, 8.6% from 18 to 24, 27.2% from 25 to 44, 18.5% from 45 to 64, and 7.4% who were 65 years of age or older. The median age was 27 years. For every 100 females, there were 118.9 males. For every 100 females age 18 and over, there were 100.0 males.

The median income for a household in the city was $42,500, and the median income for a family was $42,500. Males had a median income of $43,750 versus $22,083 for females. The per capita income for the city was $12,939. There were 9.1% of families and 6.3% of the population living below the poverty line, including no under eighteens and none of those over 64.

Education
The community is served by Morris County USD 417 public school district.

References

Further reading

External links

 Dunlap - Directory of Public Officials
 Matfield Green, A "Quiet" town of Morris County, Kansas, History and photographs.
 Dunlap city map, KDOT

Cities in Kansas
Cities in Morris County, Kansas
Populated places established in 1878
Populated places in Kansas established by African Americans